FC Olimpiki Tbilisi is a Georgian football team, which were playing in the capital, Tbilisi.  The club were playing their home games at Olimpi Stadium.

History
Founded as FSM Tbilisi.
1957: Renamed as Burevestnik Tbilisi
2000: Founded as FC Olimpi Tbilisi.
2003: Merged with Merani-91 Tbilisi, as Merani-Olimpi Tbilisi,
2003: Second team of FC Tbilisi as Olimpi Tbilisi played in Pirveli Liga.
2005: Closed.
2006: Reactivated as Olimpiki Tbilisi.

Seasons
2000–01: Olimpi Tbilisi Regionuli Liga
2001–02: Olimpi Tbilisi Regionuli Liga
2002–03: Olimpi Tbilisi Regionuli Liga
2003–04: Olimpi Tbilisi Pirveli Liga
2004–05: Olimpi Tbilisi Pirveli Liga
2005–06:
2006–07: Olimpiki Tbilisi Meore Liga
2007–08: Olimpiki Tbilisi Pirveli Liga

References

External links

Profile on KLISF

Football clubs in Georgia (country)